Mr. Walkie Talkie is a 1952 American comedy film directed by Fred Guiol and starring William Tracy, Joe Sawyer and Margia Dean. Released by Lippert Pictures, it is the final film of the Doubleday and Ames army comedy films originally produced by Hal Roach with the pair returning for service in the Korean War.

Plot

Cast
 William Tracy as Sgt. Doubleday 
 Joe Sawyer as Sgt. Ames 
 Margia Dean as Entertainer 
 Robert Shayne as Capt. Burke 
 Alan Hale Jr. as Tiny 
 Russell Hicks as Col. Lockwood 
 Frank Jenks as Jackson 
 Wong Artarne as Lt. Kim 
 Hanna Hertelendy as Jane Winters 
 Dorothy Neumann as Nina Crockett 
 Tom Hubbard as Jay 
 Kay Medford as Marge

References

Bibliography
 Robert J. Lentz. Korean War Filmography: 91 English Language Features through 2000. McFarland, 2016.

External links

Mr. Walkie Talkie at TCMDB
Mr. Walkie Talkie at BFI

1952 films
American comedy films
1952 comedy films
Lippert Pictures films
Films directed by Fred Guiol
Korean War films
American black-and-white films
1950s English-language films
1950s American films